The 2007 Mobil 1 12 Hours of Sebring was the 55th running of this event and the opening round of the 2007 American Le Mans Series season.  It took place on March 17, 2007.

Official results
Class winners are in bold.  Cars failing to complete 75% of winner's distance marked as Not Classified (NC).

Statistics
 Pole Position - #2 Audi Sport North America - 1:44.974
 Fastest Lap - #1 Audi Sport North America - 1:46.634

External links
  

Sebring
12 Hours of Sebring
12 Hours of Sebring
12 Hours Of Sebring
12 Hours Of Sebring